"Monday, Monday" is a 1966 song written by John Phillips and recorded by the Mamas & the Papas, using background instruments played by members of the Wrecking Crew for their 1966 album If You Can Believe Your Eyes and Ears. Denny Doherty was the lead vocalist.  It was the group's only #1 hit on the U.S. Billboard Hot 100,. 

Phillips said that he wrote the song quickly, in about 20 minutes. The song includes a pregnant pause before the coda, which modulates up a semitone. Succeeding Good Lovin' by the Young Rascals in the number one position, the event marked the first time in the history of the Billboard Hot 100 two songs with pregnant pauses were consecutive number one hits. 

On March 2, 1967, the Mamas & the Papas won a Grammy Award for this song, in the category Best Pop Performance by a Duo or Group with Vocal.

The song was performed at the Monterey Pop Festival (California) in 1967. The performance was filmed for the movie of the festival, but not included in the final print.

The song appears on the soundtrack of Michael Apted's film Stardust.

Chart history

Weekly charts

Year-end charts

Track listing
7-inch vinyl
 "Monday, Monday" (Phillips) – 3:27
 "Got a Feelin'" (Doherty, Phillips) – 2:44

Personnel
According to the AFM contract sheet, the following musicians played on the track.

Hal Blaine - session leader
Bones Howe
Larry Knechtel
Joe Osborn
John Phillips
P.F. Sloan
Denny Doherty - lead vocal

Cover versions
 Petula Clark on her album I Couldn't Live Without Your Love (1966)
 The Beau Brummels on their album Beau Brummels '66 (1966)
 Neil Diamond on The Feel of Neil Diamond (1966)
 Jay and the Americans on their album Livin' Above Your Head (1966)
 Sérgio Mendes on his instrumental album The Great Arrival (1966)
 Marianne Faithfull on Faithfull Forever (1966)
 Mrs. Miller on her album Will Success Spoil Mrs Miller?! (1966)
 Dee Dee Warwick B-side of "I'll Be Better Off (Without You)" (1968)
 Lenny Breau on his debut album Guitar Sounds from Lenny Breau (1968)
 Herb Alpert and the Tijuana Brass on their album The Beat of the Brass (1968)
 Ed Ames from the album Who Will Answer? and Other Songs of our Time (1968)
 Circus from the album Circus (1969)
 The Cowsills on The Johnny Cash Show
 The 5th Dimension on their album The 5th Dimension/Live!! (1971)
 Dionne Warwick on Only Love Can Break A Heart [previously unreleased recording] (1977)
 Galenskaparna och After Shave, Swedish parodic text Bandy, Bandy about bandy (1988)
 The Adventures on Lions and Tigers and Bears (1993)
 Hear'Say on Popstars (2001)
 Wilson Phillips three times: a modern rock take on their album California (2004), an a cappella single version the same year, and a straightforward take paying tribute to the original on the album Dedicated (2012)
 Matthew Sweet and Susanna Hoffs on their album Under the Covers, Vol. 1 (2006)
 Rick Price and Jack Jones covered the song on their album California Dreaming (2017)

In popular culture
 ESPN announcer Chris Berman referred to Rick Monday as "Monday, Monday".
 The Mamas and the Papas' version of "Monday, Monday" is heard in a chase scene in the 2010 movie The Other Guys.
 The song is used in one of the Discovery Channel's promos for the reality TV series Dirty Jobs, which ran for eight seasons.
 The Daredevil villain, Typhoid Mary, sings this song when in her "Typhoid" personality.
 ESPN uses the Mamas and the Papas' version in a 2017 TV commercial to promote Monday Night Football.

References

External links

 Monday, Monday at Myspace (streamed copy where licensed)
 

1966 singles
Songs written by John Phillips (musician)
Song recordings produced by Lou Adler
The Mamas and the Papas songs
Jay and the Americans songs
Grammy Hall of Fame Award recipients
Billboard Hot 100 number-one singles
Cashbox number-one singles
RPM Top Singles number-one singles
Number-one singles in South Africa
1966 songs
Dunhill Records singles